386BSD (also known as "Jolix") is a discontinued Unix operating system based on the Berkeley Software Distribution (BSD). It was released in 1992 and ran on PC-compatible computer systems based on the 32-bit Intel 80386 microprocessor. 386BSD innovations included role-based security, ring buffers, self-ordered configuration and modular kernel design.

History 
386BSD was written mainly by Berkeley alumni Lynne Jolitz and William Jolitz. William Jolitz had considerable experience with prior BSD releases while at the University of California at Berkeley (2.8 and 2.9BSD) and both contributed code developed at Symmetric Computer Systems during the 1980s, to Berkeley. Work on porting 4.3BSD-Reno and later 4.3BSD Net/2 to the Intel 80386 was done for the University of California by William Jolitz at Berkeley. 4.3BSD Net/2 was an incomplete non-operational release, with portions withheld by the University of California as encumbered (i.e. subject to an AT&T UNIX source code license). The 386BSD releases made to the public beginning in 1992 were based on portions of the 4.3BSD Net/2 release coupled with additional code (see "Missing Pieces I and II", Dr. Dobb's Journal, May–June 1992) written by William and Lynne Jolitz to make a complete operational release.

The port began in 1989 and the first, incomplete traces of the port can be found in 4.3BSD Net/2 of 1991. The port was made possible as Keith Bostic, partly influenced by Richard Stallman, had started to remove proprietary AT&T out of BSD in 1988. The port was first released in March 1992 (version 0.0) and in a much more usable version on July 14, 1992 (version 0.1). The porting process with code was extensively documented in a 17-part series written by Lynne Jolitz and William Jolitz in Dr. Dobb's Journal beginning in January 1991.

FreeBSD and NetBSD 
After the release of 386BSD 0.1, a group of users began collecting bug fixes and enhancements, releasing them as an unofficial patchkit. Due to differences of opinion between the Jolitzes and the patchkit maintainers over the future direction and release schedule of 386BSD, the maintainers of the patchkit founded the FreeBSD project in 1993 to continue their work. Around the same time, the NetBSD project was founded by a different group of 386BSD users, with the aim of unifying 386BSD with other strands of BSD development into one multi-platform system. Both projects continue to this day.

Lawsuit 
Due to a lawsuit (UNIX System Laboratories, Inc. v. Berkeley Software Design, Inc.), some potentially so-called encumbered source was agreed to have been distributed within the Berkeley Software Distribution Net/2 from the University of California, and a subsequent release (1993, 4.4BSD-Lite) was made by the university to correct this issue. However, 386BSD, Dr. Dobb's Journal, and William Jolitz and Lynne Jolitz were never parties to these or subsequent lawsuits or settlements arising from this dispute with the University of California, and continued to publish and work on the 386BSD code base before, during, and after these lawsuits without limitation. There has never been any legal filings or claims from the university, USL, or other responsible parties with respect to 386BSD. Finally, no code developed for 386BSD done by William Jolitz and Lynne Jolitz was at issue in any of these lawsuits.

Release 1.0 
In late 1994, a finished version 386BSD Release 1.0 was distributed by Dr. Dobb's Journal on CDROM only due to the immense size (600 MB) of the release (the "386BSD Reference CD-ROM") and was a best-selling CDROM for three years (1994–1997). 386BSD Release 1.0 contained a completely new kernel design and implementation, and began the process to incorporate recommendations made by earlier Berkeley designers that had never been attempted in BSD.

Release 2.0 
On August 5, 2016, an update was pushed to the 386BSD GitHub repository by developer Ben Jolitz, named version 2.0. According to the official website, Release 2.0 "built upon the modular framework to create self-healing components." However, almost all of the documentation remains the same as version 1.0, and a changelog was not available.

Relationship with BSD/386 
386BSD is often confused with BSD/386 which was a different project developed by BSDi, a Berkeley spinout, starting in 1991. BSD/386 used the same 386BSD code contributed to the University of California on 4.3BSD NET/2. Although Jolitz worked briefly for UUNET (which later spun out BSDi) in 1991, the work he did for them diverged from that contributed to the University of California and did not appear in 386BSD. Instead, William Jolitz gave regular code updates to Donn Seeley of BSDi for packaging and testing, and returned all materials when William Jolitz left that company following fundamental disagreements on company direction and goals.

Copyright and use of the code 
All rights with respect to 386BSD and JOLIX are now held exclusively by William Jolitz and Lynne Jolitz. 386BSD public releases ended in 1997 since code is now available from the many 386BSD-derived operating systems today, along with several derivatives thereof (such as FreeBSD, NetBSD and OpenBSD). Portions of 386BSD may be found in other open systems such as OpenSolaris.

Further reading 
 Jolitz, William F. and Jolitz, Lynne Greer: Porting UNIX to the 386: A Practical Approach, 17-part series in Dr. Dobb's Journal, January 1991 – July 1992:

 Jan/1991: DDJ "Designing a Software Specification"
 Feb/1991: DDJ "Three Initial PC Utilities"
 Mar/1991: DDJ "The Standalone System"
 Apr/1991: DDJ "Language Tools Cross-Support"
 May/1991: DDJ "The Initial Root Filesystem"
 Jun/1991: DDJ "Research and the Commercial Sector: Where Does BSD Fit In?"
 Jul/1991: DDJ "A Stripped-Down Kernel"
 Aug/1991: DDJ "The Basic Kernel"
 Sep/1991: DDJ "Multiprogramming and Multiprocessing, Part I"
 Oct/1991: DDJ "Multiprogramming and Multiprocessing, Part II"
 Nov/1991: DDJ "Device Autoconfiguration"
 Feb/1992: DDJ "UNIX Device Drivers, Part I"
 Mar/1992: DDJ "UNIX Device Drivers, Part II"
 Apr/1992: DDJ "UNIX Device Drivers, Part III"
 May/1992: DDJ "Missing Pieces, Part I"
 Jun/1992: DDJ "Missing Pieces, Part II"
 Jul/1992: DDJ "The Final Step: Running Light with 386BSD"

 Jolitz, William F. and Jolitz, Lynne Greer: Operating System Source Code Secrets Vol 1 The Basic Kernel, 1996, 
 Jolitz, William F. and Jolitz, Lynne Greer: Operating System Source Code Secrets Vol 2 Virtual Memory, 2000,

References

External links 
 
 William Jolitz's 386bsd Notebook
 Jolix.com
 Porting UNIX to the 386: A Practical Approach
 Memories of 386BSD releases by Lynne Jolitz
 The unknown hackers - Salon.com
 386BSD Design Notes Professional Video Series
 Frequently asked questions of 386BSD - active Q/A by authors
 
 Raising Top Quality Rabble; article mentioning 386BSD
 Archived comment on "Raising Top Quality Rabble" with remarks on the history of 386BSD by Lynne Jolitz
 Remarks on the history of 386BSD by Greg Lehey
 More information on the various releases of 386BSD
 Browsable 386BSD kernel sources

Berkeley Software Distribution
Discontinued operating systems
Free software operating systems
1992 software